David Lavery (August 27, 1949 – August 30, 2016) was an American linguist and professor of English at Middle Tennessee State University who specialized in studying pop culture, especially television. From 2006 to 2008 he served as Chair in Film & Television at Brunel University in London. He authored or edited over 20 books on popular culture, including Conversations with Joss Whedon. 

He co-produced (with George Tennyson) Owen Barfield: Man and Meaning (1994; directed and edited by Ben Levin), a documentary portrait of Owen Barfield. 

Lavery was considered an expert on several television series, including The Sopranos, Lost, and Buffy the Vampire Slayer.

Partial bibliography

Authored Works
 Late for the Sky: The Mentality of the Space Age

Edited works
 Conversations with Joss Whedon
 Seinfeld: Master of its Domain
 Deny All Knowledge: Reading The X-Files
 Fighting the Forces
 Reading the Sopranos
 Reading Deadwood
 This Thing of Ours: Investigating the Sopranos

References

1949 births
2016 deaths
Middle Tennessee State University faculty
Academics of Brunel University London